Batracomorphus is a genus of leafhoppers belonging to the family Cicadellidae.

The genus was first described by Lewis in 1834.

The genus has almost cosmopolitan distribution.

Species:
 Batracomorphus allionii Turton, 1802

References

Iassinae
Cicadellidae genera